A hatchery is a facility where eggs are hatched under artificial conditions, especially those of fish, poultry or even turtles. It may be used for ex-situ conservation purposes, i.e. to breed rare or endangered species under controlled conditions; alternatively, it may be for economic reasons (i.e. to enhance food supplies or fishery resources).

Fish hatcheries

Fish hatcheries are used to cultivate and breed a large number of fish in an enclosed environment.  Fish farms use hatcheries to cultivate fish to sell for food, or ornamental purposes, eliminating the need to find the fish in the wild and even providing some species outside their natural season. They raise the fish until they are ready to be eaten or sold to aquarium stores. Other hatcheries release the juvenile fish into a river, lake or the ocean to support commercial, tribal, or recreational fishing or to supplement the natural numbers of threatened or endangered species, a practice known as fish stocking.

Researchers have raised concerns about hatchery fish potentially breeding with wild fish.  Hatchery fish may in some cases compete with wild fish.  In the United States and Canada, there have been several salmon and steelhead hatchery reform projects intended to reduce the possibility of negative impacts from hatchery programs.  Most salmon and steelhead hatcheries are managed better and follow up to date management practices to ensure any risks are curtailed.

Poultry hatcheries

Poultry hatcheries produce a majority of the birds consumed in the developed world including chickens, turkeys, ducks, geese, and some other minor bird species. A few poultry hatcheries specialize in producing birds for sale to backyard poultry keepers, hobby farmers, and people who are interested in competing with their birds at poultry shows. These hatcheries produce chicks of several different breeds and varieties, often including some heritage or endangered breeds.

Larger poultry hatcheries are related to industrial poultry meat or egg production. This is a multibillion-dollar industry, with highly regimented production systems used to maximize bird size or egg production versus feed consumed.  Generally large numbers are produced at one time so the resulting birds are uniform in size and can be harvested (for meat) or brought into production (for eggs) at the same time. A large hatchery produces 15 million chicks annually.

Poultry generally start with naturally (most species) or artificially (turkeys and Cornish-related chicken breeds) inseminated hens that lay eggs; the eggs are cleaned and shells are checked for soundness before being put into the incubators. Incubators control temperature and humidity, and turn the eggs until just before they hatch. Three days before the eggs are scheduled to hatch, they are moved into a hatcher unit, where they are no longer turned so the embryos have time to get properly oriented for their exit from the shell, and the temperature and humidity are optimum for hatching. The eggs will hatch during a period that is often referred to as the hatching window, which can stretch from 24 to 48 hours depending on biological variation. Once the eggs hatch and the chicks are a few days old, they are often vaccinated. Chicks hatched conventionally are provided feed and water first when they reach the rearing farm. In the meantime, they rely on their yolk sac for nutrients.

See also
Endangered species
Minimum viable population
Inbreeding depression
Oystering machinery

References

External links
Hatcheries and the Protection of Wild Salmon
University of Washington Libraries Digital Collections -- Digital Collections -- Fish Hatcheries An ongoing digital collection of images related to fish hatcheries.
 - Links to hatchery reform projects

Poultry farming
Intensive farming